People with the name Paulson or its variant spellings include:
 Albert Paulsen (1925–2004), Ecuadorian-American actor
 Allen E. Paulson (1922–2000), American businessman
 Andrew Paulson (1958–2017), American businessman
Barbara Paulson (born 1928), American human computer
 Bjørn Paulson (1923–2008), Norwegian athlete
 David Paulson (born 1989), American football player
 David E. Paulson (1931–2015), American farmer and politician
 Dennis Paulson (born 1962), American professional golfer
 Erik Paulson (born 1966), American mixed martial artist
 Harvey N. Paulson (1903-1993), American farmer and politician
 Henry "Hank" Paulson (born 1946), American banker and former U.S. Treasury Secretary
 Jacob Paulson (born 1998), Australian rapper, singer, and songwriter, known professionally as JK-47
 Jay Paulson, also known as Jay, (born 1978), American actor
 John Paulson (born 1955), American hedge fund manager
 Jeanne Paulson (b.?), American actress
 Lawrence Paulson (born 1955), American computer scientist
 Michael Paulson, American journalist
 Pat Paulson (1927–1997), American comedian who ran for election to the U.S. presidency six times between 1968 and 1996 inclusive 
 Philip K. Paulson (1947–2006), American political activist
 Russell Paulson (1897–1980), American farmer and politician
 Sarah Paulson (born 1974), American actress
 Webster Paulson (1837–1887), English civil engineer
 Wilber L. Paulson (1896-1954), American businessman and politician
 Wilhelm Paulson (1857–1935), Canadian politician

See also

English-language surnames
Patronymic surnames
Surnames from given names